The Searcy County Courthouse is located on Courthouse Square in Marshall, Arkansas. It is a two-story stone structure, with a hip roof. The walls are fashioned out of rustically cut native sandstone, and it is topped by a metal hip roof with widely overhanging eaves. The front entrance is sheltered by a single-story porch supported by cast stone columns. The courthouse, the third for Searcy since its incorporation in 1838, was built in 1889 on the site of the second courthouse, which was destroyed by fire.

The building was listed on the National Register of Historic Places in 1976.

See also
National Register of Historic Places listings in Searcy County, Arkansas

References

Courthouses on the National Register of Historic Places in Arkansas
Government buildings completed in 1889
Buildings and structures in Searcy County, Arkansas
National Register of Historic Places in Searcy County, Arkansas